The North American Debating Championship is the official university debate championships of North America. It is sanctioned by the national university debating associations in the United States and Canada, the American Parliamentary Debate Association and the Canadian University Society for Intercollegiate Debate. It has been held each winter on an alternating basis between the United States and Canada since 1992. The host university arranges all judging and is not allowed in the competition. The most frequent hosts have been the University of Toronto and McGill University, which have each hosted the championship three times. Bates College, Cornell University, Johns Hopkins University, and Queen's University have each hosted twice. This tournament, often abbreviated as NorthAms, is not to be confused with the North American Universities Debating Championship, abbreviated as NAUDC, which is hosted separately in the fall of each year as a British Parliamentary Style tournament. The two events are coordinated such that each is hosted by a different country, the United States or Canada, in a given year.

The most recent iteration was held by the University of Western Ontario in January 2023. The current North American champions are from Harvard University.

Results
Since 1992, the most successful universities overall have been Yale University and the University of Toronto, each with seven championship victories. After that, Princeton University, the Massachusetts Institute of Technology, and McGill University have two championships each, and no other university has won more than once.

No team has ever repeated as the top team at the championship. Three individuals have won the top team award twice: Matthew Wansley of Yale University won back-to-back championships from 2005 to 2007. Prior to that, Nathan MacDonald and Robert Silver won first together for the University of Western Ontario in 1997–1998, then MacDonald for the University of Guelph in 1998–1999, and Silver for the University of Ottawa in 1999–2000. Three people have won the top individual debater award twice: Casey Halladay of the University of Ottawa in 1997–1998 and 1999–2000, Rory Gillis of Yale University in two consecutive years from 2004 to 2006, and Kate Falkenstien of Yale in two consecutive years from 2010 to 2012.

North American Public Speaking Championship
Every year from 1992 to 2001, and biannually from 2003 to 2007, individual public speaking was also an event at the championship. It was run as a parallel tournament, with a grand public speaking final before the final round of debate. After 2007, it was discontinued as APDA had shortened debating tournaments and discontinued public speaking as a regular event at US tournaments. No individual ever repeated as North American Public Speaking Champion. McGill University and the University of Ottawa each had three public speaking champions, the most of any university.

References

External links
 CUSID Summary of Past Championships

North American debating competitions